Cody Wong Hong-yi (born 14 March 2002) is a Hong Kong tennis player. Her brother Jack Wong is also a professional tennis player.

Wong has a career-high singles ranking by the Women's Tennis Association (WTA) of 343, achieved on 26 December 2022, and a career-high WTA doubles ranking of 156, attained on 17 October 2022. She has won two singles and 13 doubles titles at tournaments of the ITF Women's Circuit. 

In 2020, Wong reached the quarterfinals in Australian Open girls' singles, which was the best ever result of Hong Kong players in Australian Open juniors, and the first Hong Kong player to reach quarterfinals of Grand Slam singles since Patricia Hy-Boulais in 1983.  

In 2019, she also advanced to semifinals in girls' doubles of the US Open, and quarterfinals of the French Open, again the best ever result of female Hong Kong players in US Open and French Open juniors. Wong won five singles and seven doubles titles at the juniors ITF World Tennis Tour, with a career high ranking of 18.

Wong first played on the WTA Tour in the 2016 Hong Kong Open, when she was awarded a wildcard for the qualifying draw, and again in 2017 and 2018. She began competing on the ITF Women's Circuit in 2017, and won her first singles title in October 2019 in Hua Hin, Thailand.

Since returning after the COVID-19 pandemic in October 2021, Wong has a breakout season with one singles and 13 doubles titles, including her first $25k and $60k doubles title. She holds a 50–4 record when pairing up with Eudice Chong, winning ten titles together.

Wong also represents Hong Kong in the Fed Cup.

ITF finals

Singles: 4 (2 titles, 2 runner–ups)

Doubles: 19 (13 titles, 5 runner–ups, 1 cancelled)

References

External links
 
 
 

2002 births
Living people
Hong Kong female tennis players